Bierde is a village in the municipality of Böhme, Lower Saxony, that is part of Heidekreis district in the German state of Lower Saxony.

Bierder Burg 
Near the lake, known as the Bierder See, is a wood in which the ruins of an old castle are located. There are the remnants of five ditches that acted as a defence against enemies. The castle itself was intended to control the river Aller, which passes it at a distance of about 100 metres.

Legends 
There are many legends about Bierde. The Karlsberg (the highest point in Bierde) is especially shrouded in legend. One of them tells of two giants that fought and hurled stones at each other. These stones then formed the Karlsberg.

Another story tells of when the emperor Charlemagne (German: Karl der Große), stayed there, which is why the hill is named after him.

Dorfhaus 
In the centre of the village is the Dorfhaus ("village house"), the old village school.

Heidekreis
Villages in Lower Saxony